Papua New Guinea gained independence on 16 September 1975, midway through the five-year term of the members of the colonial House of Assembly of Papua and New Guinea who had been elected at the 1972 election. At independence, the former House of Assembly became the National Parliament, while members continued in office to serve out the remainder of their term. This is a list of members of the House of Assembly from 1972 to 1975 and the National Parliament from 1975 to 1977.

Notes

References

List
Papua New Guinea politics-related lists